Corrado Pani (4 March 1936 – 2 March 2005) was an Italian actor and voice actor.

Life and career 
Born in Rome, Pani began his career playing the role of Jesus as a child in a Radio Vaticana radio drama. He made his film debut in 1953, with a minor role in Dino Risi's Il viale della speranza. In 1955 he had first major theatrical role, in Thè e simpatia. He later worked on stage with Luchino Visconti, Giorgio Strehler, Krzysztof Zanussi and Luca Ronconi, among others.

Pani appeared in about fifty films; his last role was the judge in Roberto Benigni's Pinocchio (2002). He was also a television actor and a voice actor. In the 1960s, Pani had a long love affair with the singer Mina and in 1963 the couple had a son, Massimiliano.

Partial filmography 

 Doctor Antonio (1954) 
 Il viale della speranza (1953) - Roberto Franzi
 Vacanze col gangster (1954) - Gianni (voice, uncredited)
 Terrore sulla città (1957)
 White Nights (1957) - Un giovinastro
 I dritti (1957) - Aldo
 A sud niente di nuovo (1957) - Dick
 Città di notte (1958) - Paolo Prandi
 Herod the Great (1959) - Antipatro / Herodes Antipas
 Le notti dei Teddy Boys (1959) - Constantino
 Guardatele ma non toccatele (1959) - Claudio, l'aviere
 Genitori in blue-jeans (1960) - Giorgio
 Call Girls of Rome (1960) - Un giovane ricattatore
 Under Ten Flags (1960) - Marinaio tedesco
 Il peccato degli anni verdi (1960) - Augusto d'Aquino
 Rocco and His Brothers (1960) - Ivo
 Run with the Devil (1960) - Giulio Nardi
 Cleopatra's Daughter (1960) - Pharaoh Nemorat / Keops
 Girl with a Suitcase (1961) - Marcello Fainardi
 Amazons of Rome (1961) - Muzio Scevola
 A Day for Lionhearts (1961) - Mortati
 La monaca di Monza (1962) - Molteno
 A Queen for Caesar (1962) - Ptolemaio
 Whisky a mezzogiorno (1962)
 Bora Bora (1968) - Roberto Ferrio
 Interrabang (1969) - Marco
 Matalo! (1970) - Bart
 Gli ordini sono ordini (1972) - Gangster
 Testa in giù, gambe in aria (1972) - Andrea
 Anna: the Pleasure, the Torment (1973) - Guido Salvi
 La notte dell'ultimo giorno (1973) - Sandro
 Ancora una volta prima di lasciarci (1973) - Giorgio
 La minorenne (1974) - Spartaco, the artist
 Gambling City (1974) - Pio Naldi
 Drama of the Rich (1975) - Corrado
 Lips of Lurid Blue (1975) - Marco Alessi
 Watch Me When I Kill (1977) - Lukas
 Dove volano i corvi d'argento (1977) - Istevene
 Francesca è mia (1986) - Andrea
 'O Re (1988) - Generale Coviello
 Pinocchio (2002) - Giudice

References

External links 

1936 births
2005 deaths
Male actors from Rome
Italian male stage actors
Italian male film actors
Italian male child actors
Italian male television actors
Italian male voice actors
People of Lazian descent